Mauges-sur-Loire (literally Mauges on Loire) is a commune in the Maine-et-Loire department of western France. La Pommeraye is the municipal seat.

History 
It was established on 15 December 2015 and consists of the former communes of Beausse, Botz-en-Mauges, Bourgneuf-en-Mauges, La Chapelle-Saint-Florent, Le Marillais, Le Mesnil-en-Vallée, Montjean-sur-Loire, La Pommeraye, Saint-Florent-le-Vieil, Saint-Laurent-de-la-Plaine and Saint-Laurent-du-Mottay.

Population

See also 
Communes of the Maine-et-Loire department

References 

Communes of Maine-et-Loire
States and territories established in 2015
Anjou